Thomas Ongelibel Remengesau (28 November 1929 – 3 August 2019), also known as Thomas Remengesau Sr., was a politician in Palau. He was Vice President of Palau from 1985 to 1988, and acting President of Palau in 1985 and President of Palau from 1988 to 1989 following the violent deaths of two previous presidents.

When President Haruo Remeliik was assassinated in June 1985, Vice President Oiterong returned from New York City to Palau on 2 July to take office of the President. Between these dates Minister of Justice Remengesau served as acting President until 2 July 1985.

Remengesau was elected as Vice President in the special election in August 1985. After the shooting of President Lazarus Salii in August 1988, Remengesau became the President of Palau until Ngiratkel Etpison was sworn in January 1989.

Family
Remengesau was married to Ferista Esang Remengesau, who served as First Lady of Palau during her husband's brief terms as President. They had eight children. Their eldest child is Thomas Remengesau Jr., who has been the President of Palau from 2001 to 2009 and from 2013 to 2021. Valerie Whipps, daughter of Thomas Sr. and Ferista Esang Remengesau married Surangel Whipps Jr., a businessman and current President of Palau. Remengesau died on 3 August 2019, aged 89 during his son's last presidential term.

References

1929 births
2019 deaths
Presidents of Palau
Vice presidents of Palau
People from Koror
Justice Ministers of Palau
20th-century Palauan politicians